Chiloglottis palachila, commonly known as the spade-lipped wasp orchid, is a species of orchid endemic to some of the higher places in northern New South Wales. It has two leaves and a single green to greenish pink flower with a black, ant-like callus on the base of the labellum. The tips of the lateral sepals have distinctive swollen, brown glandular tips.

Description
Flowering occurs from April to June.

Taxonomy and naming
Chiloglottis palachila was first formally described in 1991 by David Jones and Mark Clements from a specimen collected at Barrington Tops and the description was published in Australian Orchid Research. Jones notes that the specific epithet (palachila) is "from the Latin palachilus meaning "spade-shaped".

Distribution and habitat
The spade-lipped wasp orchid grows in open forest near rainforest, especially near streams, but also under low shrubs on exposed peaks. It occurs in disjunct populations at Point Lookout, Barrington Tops and Mount Kaputar National Park.

References

External links 

palachila
Orchids of New South Wales
Plants described in 1991